Amrit Kaur Tewari (September 5, 1938 – January 13, 2018) was an Indian dental physician and a former Dean of the Post Graduate Institute of Medical Education and Research (PGIMER), Chandigarh. She also served as Head, Oral Health Sciences Centre, PGI.  She was the daughter of Sardar Tirath Singh Gurum who was the minister in the Erstwhile PEPSU .

She was the first person to be selected as the Life member of the Indian Society of Pedodontics and Preventive Dentistry (ISPPD) and is a Fellow of the Indian Dental Association and the National Academy of Medical Sciences. She was also former member of the Chandigarh Municipal Corporation.

After her superannuation from PGIMER, she was made the Professor Emeritus of the Institute. She had written several medical articles in peer reviewed journals and had published a book, Fluorides and Dental Caries : A Compendium The Government of India awarded her the fourth highest civilian honour of the Padma Shri in 1992. Tewari, a recipient of the Certificate of Merit of the Pierre Fauchard Academy, was married to V. N. Tewari, an author and professor of Punjabi at Punjab University and has a son, Manish Tewari, an Indian politician and a former Minister of Information and Broadcasting. V. N. Tewari was the victim of Punjab insurgency, when he was shot dead by militants in 1984.

Family 
Amrit Kaur Tewari's father Sardar Tirath Singh was a minister in the erstwhile PEPSU. Her brother Barjinder Shingh was chairman of the Central Board of Direct Taxes while her sister Surinder Kaur retired as an IRS officer. Her husband VN Tewari was a professor at the Punjab University. Her son was the former Union Minister Manish Tewari, and daughter Puneet Tewari, is settled in the US.

Death 
Amrit Kaur Tewari died on January 15, 2018, due to prolonged illness. She was survived by her son the former Union Minister Manish Tewari.

See also 

 Manish Tewari

References 

1938 births
2018 deaths
Recipients of the Padma Shri in medicine
Medical doctors from Chandigarh
Indian dentists
Indian medical academics
Indian medical writers
Chandigarh local politicians
Fellows of the National Academy of Medical Sciences
Indian women non-fiction writers
20th-century Indian medical doctors
20th-century Indian women scientists
Indian women medical doctors
20th-century women physicians
20th-century women writers